The 2021–22 season was the 63rd season of the US Monastir men's basketball team and the 2nd of the team in the Basketball Africa League (BAL).

Monastir won both the Championnat National A and the Tunisian Basketball Cup. On May 28, 2022, it won its first-ever BAL championship after winning the 2022 BAL Finals over Petro de Luanda.

Transcations

Departures

Incoming

Roster

References

US Monastir